

The Flatbush Reformed Protestant Dutch Church, also known as the Flatbush Reformed Church, is a historic Dutch Reformed church – now a member of the Reformed Church in America – at 890 Flatbush Avenue in the Flatbush neighborhood of Brooklyn, New York City. The church complex consists of the church, cemetery, parsonage and church house.

H.P. Lovecraft mentions the complex in passing in his story "The Horror at Red Hook", speaking of its "iron-railed yard of Netherlandish gravestones". The Church House and grounds are featured in season 2 of the Hulu TV series The Path, where they are used as the Meyerists' New York City headquarters.

History
The land on which the complex sits has been in continuous use for religious purposes longer than any other in New York City.

The congregation was founded in 1654 and the original church was built under the direction of Jan Gerritse Strijker at the order of Peter Stuyvesant. The 2.5-story stone Federal style church building designed by Thomas Fardon was constructed in 1793-98 and is the third church building on the site. It features a stone tower with stone belfry. The stained glass windows are by Tiffany studios and commemorate the descendants of many early settlers of Flatbush.  The building was constructed of Manhattan schist, and the architecture includes Romanesque features such as arched windows and doors, as well as Tuscan colonettes. The church's bell was imported from Holland, and paid for by John Vanderbilt.

The bodies of American soldiers who died in the Battle of Long Island during the American War are reportedly buried underneath the church structure.

The cemetery is the last resting place for most of the founding families of Flatbush.  The earliest legible grave marker dates to 1754. The 1853 parsonage is a 2.5-story wood-frame house designed in a vernacular style transitional between the Greek Revival and Italianate styles.  It was moved to its present site at 2101-03 Kenmore Terrace in 1918. The church house is a 2.5-story red brick and limestone building designed by Meyers & Mathieu in the Colonial Revival style and erected in 1923–24.

The complex was initially designated a New York City Landmark in 1966, with the boundary expanded in 1979.  It was listed on the National Register of Historic Places in 1983.

Gallery

See also
Flatbush African Burial Ground
List of New York City Landmarks
National Register of Historic Places listings in Kings County, New York

References
Notes

External links

Official Facebook page

Churches in Brooklyn
Properties of religious function on the National Register of Historic Places in Brooklyn
Federal architecture in New York City
New York City Designated Landmarks in Brooklyn
Cemeteries in Brooklyn
Protestant Reformed cemeteries
Reformed Church in America churches
Former Dutch Reformed churches in New York (state)
Flatbush, Brooklyn
Dutch-American culture in New York City